The following is an alphabetical list of subregions in the United Nations geoscheme for Oceania, created by the United Nations Statistics Division (UNSD).

Oceania
UN geoscheme subregions of Oceania

UN Subregions 

The United Nations geoscheme subdivides the region into Australia and New Zealand, Melanesia, Micronesia, and Polynesia. The UNSD notes that "the assignment of countries or areas to specific groupings is for statistical convenience and does not imply any assumption regarding political or other affiliation of countries or territories".

See also 
 List of continents and continental subregions by population
 List of countries by United Nations geoscheme
 United Nations geoscheme
 United Nations geoscheme for Africa
 United Nations geoscheme for the Americas
 United Nations geoscheme for Asia
 United Nations geoscheme for Europe
 United Nations Statistics Division

Notes

References 

Geography of Oceania
Oceania